Hipkiss is a surname. Notable people with the surname include:

Hipkiss (artist) (born 1964), British artist duo, also known as 'Chris Hipkiss'
Dan Hipkiss (born 1982), English rugby union player